Ysleta Independent School District is a school district based in El Paso, Texas (USA). Ysleta ISD is the third largest school district in the city of El Paso. All of the district area covers sections of El Paso.

The Ysleta Independent School District was founded in 1915 as a rural education district with one high school, Ysleta High School and a number of elementary and intermediate schools. As the city of El Paso grew, many of the schools of the YISD were absorbed into the city. Today the district has 59 campuses.

During the 1990s, the district operated at state minimum achievement levels. Due to changes in leadership, the district turned itself around and in 1998 it emerged the first urban school district anywhere in the state to be named a "Recognized District" for student performance on the Texas Assessment of Academic Skills test or TAAS. Ten district schools have been named National Blue Ribbon Schools while eight others are National Title One Distinguished Campuses.

Ysleta ISD's superintendent is Xavier De La Torre.

In 2009, the school district was rated "academically acceptable" by the Texas Education Agency.

The Texas Education Agency's college readiness performance data shows that only 5% (148 out of 2836 students) of the graduates of the class of 2010 of the Ysleta school district met TEA's average performance criterion on SAT or ACT college admission tests.

Demographics
Mexican Americans make up a large number of students. Margarita Espino Calderón and Liliana Minaya-Rowe, authors of Designing and Implementing Two-Way Bilingual Programs, wrote that the student population of Ysleta ISD was "heterogenous."

List of schools
, 22 schools had two-way bilingual educational programs.

Secondary schools

High schools
Bel Air High School- 
1999-2000 National Blue Ribbon School
Del Valle High School - 
Eastwood High School - 
J. M. Hanks High School - 
Parkland High School - 
Riverside High School - 
Ysleta High School - 
Valle Verde Early College High School -

Middle schools
Bel Air Middle School
Del Valle Middle School
Desert View Middle School (Abandoned)
1983-84 National Blue Ribbon School
Eastwood Middle School
A Texas School to Watch: 2011–2012, 2013-2014
Hanks Middle School
Parkland Middle School
Rio Bravo Middle School
Riverside Middle School
Ysleta Middle School

Elementary-intermediate (K-8) schools

Alicia R. Chacón International School
Eastwood Knolls School

Elementary schools
Ascarate Elementary School
1998-99 National Blue Ribbon School
Capistrano Elementary School
Cedar Grove Elementary School
Constance Hulbert Elementary School
Del Norte Heights Elementary School
Del Valle Elementary School
Desertaire Elementary School
Dolphin Terrace Elementary School
East Point Elementary School
Eastwood Heights Elementary School
Edgemere Elementary School
2000-01 National Blue Ribbon School
Glen Cove Elementary School
2000-01 National Blue Ribbon School
Hacienda Heights Elementary School
2000-01 National Blue Ribbon School
Lancaster Elementary School
LeBarron Park Elementary School
Loma Terrace Elementary School
Marian Manor Elementary School
Mesa Vista Elementary School
Mission Valley Elementary School
North Loop Elementary School
1987-88 National Blue Ribbon School
North Star Elementary School
Parkland Elementary School
Pasodale Elementary School
Pebble Hills Elementary School
Presa Elementary School
R.E.L. Washington Elementary School
Ramona Elementary School
2007, 2021 National Blue Ribbon School
Sageland Elementary School
1998-99 National Blue Ribbon School
Scotsdale Elementary School
South Loop Elementary School
Thomas Manor Elementary School
Tierra Del Sol Elementary School
Vista Hills Elementary School
Ysleta Elementary School

Pre-kindergarten centers
Parkland Pre-K
Ysleta Pre-K

Alternative campuses
Cesar Chavez Academy
Plato Academy
Tejas School of Choice

Special campuses
Homebound Campus
Ysleta Community Learning Center
Young Women's Leadership Academy

See also
List of school districts in Texas

References

External links
 
 

 
School districts in El Paso, Texas
Education in El Paso, Texas
1915 establishments in Texas